Melenci is a village located in the Zrenjanin municipality, in the Central Banat District of Serbia. It is situated in the Autonomous Province of Vojvodina. The village has a Serb ethnic majority (93.40%) and its population numbering 6,737 people (2002 census). The brackish water lake of Okanj is nearby.

Name
In Serbian the village is known as Melenci or Меленци, in Hungarian as Melence, and in German as Melenze.

Historical population

1961: 8,254
1971: 8,008
1981: 7,685
1991: 7,270
2002: 6,737
2011: 5,956

Sports

FK Rusanda Melenci is the local football club. It was founded in 1925.

Trivia

Rusanda Spa is located on the territory of Melenci.

There is an abandoned  Windmill at the road to Kikinda. It is one of the last two windmills left in Banat.

See also
List of places in Serbia
List of cities, towns and villages in Vojvodina

References

External links 

Official presentation of the village (in Serbian)

Zrenjanin
Populated places in Serbian Banat